Cayuga Secondary School is a secondary school located at 70 Highway 54, Cayuga, Ontario, Canada. It is part of the Grand Erie District School Board. Cayuga Secondary School opened in 1963, under the name Cayuga Technical and Commercial High School since it did not offer a grade 13 program. It earned secondary school status in 1970. The students are from J. L. Mitchener, Rainham Central, Seneca Central Seneca Unity and Oneida Central public schools, Caledonia Centennial, as well as some students from the Six Nations Reserve and from the Catholic elementary school, St. Stephen's. The school currently has about 600 students enrolled.

See also
List of high schools in Ontario

Football Team 
Cayuga is the home of the Warriors Football Team. The team has currently joined "Forces" with one of its two rivals (Hagersville/McKinnon) Hagersville. After a previous coach during the 2015 season, the two schools contacted one another and became the "Warricanes".
The football team was denied entry into the Haldimand-Norfolk Football League but continued on to play exhibition against Simcoe (Sabres), Delhi (Raiders), Waterford (Wolves), McKinnon (Blue Devils) and the Bishop Mac Celtics of Guelph. 
Cayuga and Hagersville lost 3 of 4 games (First game no score was kept) defeating a team both teams haven't won against in more than 5 years the Waterford Wolved 10–1. The team no longer plays with two different jerseys they have made up a jersey scheme. 
The Warricanes were granted entry into the league for the 2017 season and will continue to play football as long as they need to.

Cayuga Warriors football began in 1987 led by then head coach Mike Warbick. Their first season only had two wins the first one coming against the Hurricanes of a score 2–1.

The next season Cayuga went on to an undefeated season winning the Zone championship dubbed the “No Mercy Tour”

References
 Grand Erie High Schools Retrieved March 19, 2007.
 Grand Erie District School Board School Boundary Maps Retrieved March 19, 2007.
 A History of Haldimand Schools; The Haldimand Board of Education

High schools in Haldimand County
1963 establishments in Ontario
Educational institutions established in 1963